Jeffrey Otoo  (born 21 January 1998) is a Ghanaian footballer who plays as a midfielder for Valley United FC in the National Independent Soccer Association, and for the Rome Gladiators in the National Indoor Soccer League.

Career
On 1 June 2016, Otoo signed with Major League Soccer side Atlanta United FC from second division Ghanaian side Charity Stars. He spent the 2016 season on loan with United Soccer League side Charleston Battery. Otoo was released by Atlanta on 20 November 2017.

On 27 August 2020, Otoo was named UPSL National Player of the Week while playing for Ginga Atlanta.

References

External links
Profile at Atlanta United
NISL profile
NISA profile

1998 births
Living people
Ghanaian footballers
Ghanaian expatriate footballers
Association football forwards
Atlanta United FC players
Charleston Battery players
Des Moines Menace players
Expatriate soccer players in the United States
USL Championship players
USL League Two players
National Independent Soccer Association players
Charity Stars F.C. players
United Premier Soccer League players
Ghanaian expatriate sportspeople in the United States
Footballers from Accra